The bare-backed fruit bat or Moluccan naked-backed fruit bat (Dobsonia moluccensis) is a fruit bat in the family Pteropodidae.

Taxonomy and etymology
It was described as a new species in 1830 by Jean René Constant Quoy and Joseph Paul Gaimard who placed it in the now-defunct bat genus Hypoderma, with the scientific name H. moluccensis. Its relationship with Dobsonia magna requires further investigation. Its species name "moluccensis" means "belonging to the Moluccas," which is where the species is found.

Description
Its fur is brown and its feet have distinctive white claws. It is smaller than the New Guinea naked-backed fruit bat. Males weigh  while females weigh . Its ears are pointed, and its second digits lack claws, unlike flying foxes. Its wings attach at the back along the spine rather than along the sides of the body.

Biology and ecology
The bare-backed fruit bat is a seasonal breeder, with the mating season from April to June. Females give birth from mid-August through November. It is found in Indonesia, East Timor, Papua New Guinea, and Australia.

As of 2016, it is considered a least-concern species by the IUCN.

References

Dobsonia
Bats of Australia
Mammals of Queensland
Bats of Oceania
Bats of Southeast Asia
Bats of Indonesia
Mammals of Timor
Mammals described in 1830
Taxa named by Jean René Constant Quoy
Taxa named by Joseph Paul Gaimard
Bats of New Guinea